Werner's thick-toed gecko (Pachydactylus werneri) is a species of lizard in the family Gekkonidae. The species is endemic to Namibia.

Etymology
The specific name, werneri, is in honor of Austrian herpetologist Franz Werner.

Geographic range
In Namibia P. werneri is found in the areas around Karibib, Maltahöhe, and Swakopmund.

Description

Reproduction
P. werneri is oviparous.

References

Further reading
Bauer AM, Lamb T, Branch WR (2006). "A revision of the Pachydactylus serval and P. weberi groups (Reptilia: Gekkota: Gekkonidae) of Southern Africa, with the description of eight new species". Proceedings of the California Academy of Sciences, Fourth Series 57: 595–709. (Pachydactylus werneri, pp. 654–655 + Figures 54–57).
FitzSimons VF (1943). The Lizards of South Africa. Pretoria: Transvaal Museum. xvi + 528 pp. (Pachydactylus werneri, new status, p. 85).
Hewitt J (1935). "Some new forms of batrachians and reptiles from South Africa". Records of the Albany Museum 4: 283–357. (Pachydactylus capensis werneri, new subspecies, p. 315).
Wermuth H (1965). "Liste der rezenten Amphibien und Reptilien, Gekkonidae, Pygopodidae, Xantusiidae". Das Tierreich 80: 1–246. (Pachydactylus werneri, p. 124). (in German).

Endemic fauna of Namibia
Pachydactylus
Reptiles of Namibia
Reptiles described in 1935